Praneet Bhat is an Indian television actor best known for his role as Shakuni in the epic TV series Mahabharat (2013–2014).

Life and career
Bhat is a Kashmiri Pandit and hails from Srinagar. After completing his engineering, he worked with a software company, Wipro.

Bhat shifted to Mumbai in 2002, and after modelling, he started his television career in 2004, and went on to appear on the television programs Kitni Mast Hai Zindagi,  Hotel Kingston, Kituu Sabb Jaantii Hai, Ssshhhh..Phir Koi Hai and Kaajjal.

He played the geeky character Aditya  in Geet(2010–2011).  He appeared in the role of Shakuni in the mythological saga Mahabharat, which earned him worldwide fame. In September 2014, he became one of the contestants of eighth season of reality show Bigg Boss.

In November 2015, he married his longtime girlfriend, Kanchan Sharma. His Mahabharat and Bigg Boss close friends attended the wedding. He also portrayed a negative role in Star Plus's Rishton Ka Chakravyuh. Bhat then played Darius III in Porus.

Since 2018, Bhat is portraying a genie in the show Aladdin - Naam Toh Suna Hoga and in 2021 in he will feature as the magician Jafar in the upcoming story Aladdin and the Magic Lamp on Alif Laila in Dangal TV

Television

References

External links

 

Indian male television actors
Living people
People from Srinagar
Kashmiri Pandits
Indian people of Kashmiri descent
Male actors from Jammu and Kashmir
Year of birth missing (living people)